Lead telluride is a compound of lead and tellurium (PbTe). It crystallizes in the NaCl crystal structure with Pb atoms occupying the cation and Te forming the anionic lattice. It is a narrow gap semiconductor with a band gap of 0.32 eV. It occurs naturally as the mineral altaite.

Properties 
 Dielectric constant ~1000.
 Electron Effective mass ~ 0.01me
 Hole mobility, μp = 600 cm2 V−1 s−1 (0 K); 4000 cm2 V−1 s−1 (300 K)

Applications 
PbTe has proven to be a very important intermediate thermoelectric material. In order to improve the thermoelectric performance of materials, the power factor needs to be maximized and the thermal conductivity needs to be minimized.

The PbTe system can be optimized for power generation applications by improving the power factor via band engineering. It can be doped either n-type or p-type with appropriate dopants. Halogens are often used as n-type doping agents. PbCl2, PbBr2 and PbI2 are commonly used to produce donor centers. Other n-type doping agents such as Bi2Te3, TaTe2, MnTe2, will substitute for Pb and create uncharged vacant Pb-sites. These vacant sites are subsequently filled by atoms from the lead excess and the valence electrons of these vacant atoms will diffuse through crystal. Common p-type doping agents are Na2Te, K2Te and Ag2Te. They substitute for Te and create vacant uncharged Te sites. These sites are filled by Te atoms which are ionized to create additional positive holes. With band gap engineering, the maximum zT of PbTe has been reported to be 0.8 - 1.0 at ~650K.

Collaborations at Northwestern University boosted the zT of PbTe by significantly reducing its thermal conductivity using ‘all-scale hierarchical architecturing'. With this approach, point defects, nanoscale precipitates and mesoscale grain boundaries are introduced as effective scattering centers for phonons with different mean free paths, without affecting charge carrier transport. By applying this method, the record value for zT of PbTe that has been achieved in Na doped PbTe-SrTe system is approximately 2.2.

In addition, PbTe is also often alloyed with tin to make lead tin telluride, which is used as an infrared detector material.

See also 
 Yellow Duckling, which used a lead telluride sensor to make the first infrared linescan camera

References

External links 
 National Pollutant Inventory Lead and compounds fact sheet
 Webelements

Tellurides
Lead(II) compounds
IV-VI semiconductors
Thermoelectricity
Rock salt crystal structure